Annisse is a town in the Gribskov Municipality in North Zealand, Denmark. It is located five kilometers south of Helsinge and 13 kilometers northwest of Hillerød.  As of 2022, it has a population of 322.

The sports club  is based in the town.

References 

Cities and towns in the Capital Region of Denmark
Gribskov Municipality